Thomas Buergenthal (born 11 May 1934, in Ľubochňa, Czechoslovakia, today Slovakia) is an international lawyer, scholar, law school dean, and former judge of the International Court of Justice (ICJ).  He resigned his ICJ post as of 6 September 2010 and returned to his position at The George Washington University Law School where he is currently the Lobingier Professor Emeritus of Comparative Law and Jurisprudence.

Early life

Thomas Buergenthal is known as one of the youngest holocaust victims to survive places like Auschwitz and Sachsenhausen, which were horrific concentration camps. The first 11 years of his life were spent under German authority. It is known that when the Germans were pushed out by the Soviet army in January 1945, the Germans forced the victims out by marching them; it was a long journey, people began to get tired and if they stopped they were executed.  Buergenthal was one of the few children to survive the three day march to Sachsenhausen, where Buergenthal and his family would soon be liberated. Buergenthal, born to German-Jewish/Polish-Jewish parents who had moved from Germany to Czechoslovakia in 1933, grew up in the Jewish ghetto of Kielce (Poland) and later in the concentration camps at Auschwitz and Sachsenhausen. After the War he lived with his mother in Göttingen.

On 4 December 1951, he emigrated from Germany to the United States. He studied at Bethany College in West Virginia (graduated 1957), and received his J.D. at New York University Law School in 1960, and his LL.M. and S.J.D. degrees in international law from Harvard Law School. Judge Buergenthal is the recipient of numerous honorary degrees from American, European and Latin American Universities, including the University of Heidelberg in Germany, the Free University of Brussels in Belgium, the State University of New York, the American University, the University of Minnesota, and the George Washington University.

Career
Buergenthal is a specialist in international law and human rights law.

Buergenthal served as a judge on the International Court of Justice at The Hague from 2 March 2000 to his resignation on 6 September 2010. Prior to his election to the International Court of Justice, he was the Lobingier Professor of Comparative Law and Jurisprudence at The George Washington University Law School. He was Dean of Washington College of Law of American University from 1980 to 1985, and held endowed professorships at the University of Texas, SUNY/Buffalo Law School, and Emory University. While at Emory, he was the director of the Human Rights Program of the Carter Center.  Buergenthal served as a judge for many years, including lengthy periods on various specialized international bodies. Between 1979 and 1991, he served as a judge of the Inter-American Court of Human Rights, including a term as that court's president; from 1989 to 1994, he was a judge on the Inter-American Development Bank's Administrative Tribunal; in 1992 and 1993, he served on the United Nations Truth Commission for El Salvador; and from 1995 to 1999, he was a member of the United Nations Human Rights Committee.

Buergenthal is the author of more than a dozen books and a large number of articles on international law, human rights and comparative law subjects. He is member of a number of editorial boards of law journals, including the American Journal of International Law.  He also serves a member of the Ethics Commission of the International Olympic Committee.

Buergenthal was the sole dissenter in the Israeli Wall advisory opinion in July 2004, where the ICJ found 14-1 that the Israeli-built barrier into the occupied West Bank violates international law and should be torn down.

Judge Buergenthal is a co-recipient of the 2008 Gruber Prize for Justice for his contributions to the promotion and protection of human rights in different parts of the world, and particularly in Latin America.  He is also a recipient of the following awards: Goler T. Butcher Medal, American Society of International Law, 1997; Manley O. Hudson Medal, American Society of International Law, 2002; Elie Wiesel Award, U.S. Holocaust Memorial Council, 2015; and Olympic Order, International Olympic Committee, 2015.

His memoir, A Lucky Child, which describes his experience in various German concentration camps, has been translated into more than a dozen languages, including German, French, Spanish, Japanese, Dutch, Norwegian and Swedish.

Selected works

 Vol. 2  Vol. 3 

, Thomas, Shelton, Stewart, 4th ed. (2009)
, 5th ed. (2013), 4th ed. (2007)

Lectures
A Brief History of International Human Rights Law in the Lecture Series of the United Nations Audiovisual Library of International Law

"The Lawmaking Role of International Tribunals," Dean Fred F. Herzog Memorial Lecture, October 17, 2011, The John Marshall Law School, Chicago, Illinois.

References

External links
 ICJ Biography of Thomas Buergenthal
 Biographical Interview with Thomas Buergenthal published at "Quellen zur Geschichte der Menschenrechte"
 A Lucky Child: A Memoir of Surviving Auschwitz as a Young Boy Interview with Thomas Buergenthal

1934 births
Auschwitz concentration camp survivors
Bethany College (West Virginia) alumni
Czechoslovak Jews
Harvard Law School alumni
Inter-American Court of Human Rights judges
International Court of Justice judges
International law scholars
Jewish American writers
Living people
Nazi-era ghetto inmates
New York University School of Law alumni
People from Ružomberok District
Sachsenhausen concentration camp survivors
Slovak expatriates in Poland
United Nations Human Rights Committee members
Commanders Crosses of the Order of Merit of the Federal Republic of Germany
American judges of United Nations courts and tribunals
American judges of international courts and tribunals
21st-century American Jews
Members of the Institut de Droit International